Rafael García Cortés (born 18 January 1958) is a Spanish retired footballer who played as a defender.

He amassed La Liga totals of 312 games and 24 goals, having played mainly for Real Madrid and Zaragoza.

Club career
Born in Madrid, García Cortés competed in 12 La Liga seasons during his 16-year professional career, having started with Real Madrid Castilla in Segunda División. In the top flight he represented Real Madrid (three and a half years), Burgos CF (one season, loaned), Real Zaragoza (four and a half seasons, having arrived at the club in January 1983), RCD Mallorca (two years) and Rayo Vallecano (1992–93), retiring at the age of 35 with the latter.

García Cortés competed in the 1980–81 European Cup with Real Madrid – during his spell at the Santiago Bernabéu Stadium, he was part of the team dubbed Madrid of the Garcías– appearing in four matches and starting in three: in the final against Liverpool, his 82nd-minute mistake whilst attempting a clearance enabled Alan Kennedy to score the game's only goal in Paris.

After retiring, García Cortés returned to Real as youth system coordinator.

Honours
Real Madrid
La Liga: 1978–79
Copa del Rey: 1981–82

Zaragoza
Copa del Rey: 1985–86

References

External links

1958 births
Living people
Footballers from Madrid
Spanish footballers
Association football defenders
La Liga players
Segunda División players
Real Madrid Castilla footballers
Real Madrid CF players
Burgos CF (1936) footballers
Real Zaragoza players
RCD Mallorca players
Rayo Vallecano players
Spain youth international footballers
Spain under-21 international footballers
Spain under-23 international footballers
Spain amateur international footballers
Spanish football managers
La Liga managers
CD Tenerife managers